Muhammad Imran Qadir (born September 3, 1978), also known as M. I. Qadir, is a Pakistani pharmaceutical scientist.

Life and education 

Qadir received his early education from Shujabad, Multan. He received his B.Pharm degree from Bahauddin Zakariya University, Multan, Pakistan. Later he attended Quaid-i-Azam University, Islamabad and received his Ph.D degree in subject of Biochemistry and Molecular Biology.

He worked in the College of Pharmacy, Government College University (Faisalabad).

He then became a researcher and professor (associate) at Bahauddin Zakariya University, Multan, Pakistan. There, he is heading "Phage Therapy & Drug Design Laboratory" of Institute of Molecular Biology and Biotechnology.

Research contributions 

 Qadir test: Qadir invented a medical test, known as the Qadir test, for diagnosis of cancer. The approach takes a few hours using standard laboratory equipment for the analysis of plasma lipids (triglycerides, cholesterol, LDL-cholesterol and HDL-cholesterol) and a change in the lipid profile is used as marker for diagnosis of cancer. A number of prospective studies were carried out by the researcher by taking fasting blood samples of study subjects from all the major four types of cancers: carcinomas, sarcomas, lymphomas, and leukemias.
 Qadirvirtide and Qadir-C30: His work also includes invention of anti-HIV drugs, Qadirvirtide and Qadir-C30. These are fusion inhibitors that may be used as prophylaxis or for the treatment of AIDS. These are synthetic peptides composed of 36 and 30 amino acids respectively. These block the entry of HIV genome into human CD4 cells by binding to HR1 region of spike protein of HIV, so that the virus can not come close to the human cell membrane and ultimately fusion of the viral envelope with human cell membrane is prevented.
 Qadir theory of cancer etiology: He has posed that viruses are the cause of cancer, the idea was presented as a theory of cancer etiology. He postulated that "Viruses are the causative agents of cancer: 100% of cancer patients contain virus/es in their body which are responsible for the cancer." He also argued that some studies have opposed the idea, but he rejected them because laboratory methods were not used to detect viruses in those studies. The theory was concluded with the point that, in near future, viruses will be isolated from all cancer patients as causative agent of a specific cancer.
 Qadirphages: He discovered local bacteriophages to be used as anti-bacterial products which were named as Qadirphages. The evolution of antibiotic resistance in bacteria has increased research in the field of therapies to search alternative methods to control the infections. Qadir isolated local phages, characterized them and found their antibacterial activities. The phages showed maximum propagation at 37 °C indicating that these work best at human body temperature. SDS-PAGE analysis confirmed the presence of protein cover and showed the various bands ranging from 10 to 200 kDa. Nucleic acid analysis confirmed the presence of RNA with a size of approximately 20 kb. Transmission electron microscopy indicated that the isolated phages belonged to Siphoviridae, Leviviridae, and Podoviridae families.
 Fungal Research: He also discovered new genes in local fungi which are involved in curing skin diseases caused by these local fungi.
 QadirVID-19: He designed a fusion inhibitor for specific treatment of COVID-19, which was named as QadirVID-19. This drug is a synthetic peptide composed of 30 amino acids.
 Publications: He has published more than 600 research articles. He has also written and edited more 15  books in the field of medical sciences. Among them, "Rare and Uncommon Diseases" and "Bacterial Diseases" are famous.
 Mentorship: He is an HEC approved supervisor for PhD research in Pakistan. He has contributed in health-related community awareness programs.

Awards and recognition 

Qadir was named best young research scholar by Higher Education Commission of Pakistan, and Productive Scientist of Pakistan, by Pakistan Council for Science and Technology, Ministry of Science and Technology (Pakistan). He received the Research Productivity Award, by Pakistan Council for Science and Technology, Ministry of Science and Technology (Pakistan). He has also received a gold medal in the field of biotechnology from Pakistan Academy of Sciences (PAS).

Fellowships and membership 

Qadir is a Fellow of The Linnean Society of London, UK. He is a member of the American Society for Microbiology the International Dermoscopy Society (IDSS), Italy,
and the French Society for Cell Biology. He is also member of other healthcare-related global societies.

References 

Pakistani pharmacologists
Pakistani textbook writers
21st-century Pakistani scientists
Theoretical chemists
Fellows of the Linnean Society of London
People from Islamabad
People from Multan
Quaid-i-Azam University alumni
1978 births
Living people
Academic staff of Bahauddin Zakariya University
Bahauddin Zakariya University alumni
Pakistani inventors
Pakistani scholars
Pakistani scientists